Berit Ås (born Skarpaas, 10 April 1928 in Fredrikstad, Norway) is a Norwegian politician, psychologist, and feminist, who is currently Professor Emerita of social psychology at the University of Oslo. She was the first leader of the Socialist Left Party (1975–1976), and served as a Member of the Parliament of Norway 1973–1977. She was also a deputy member of parliament from 1969–1973 (for the Norwegian Labour Party), and from 1977–1981 (for the Socialist Left Party). She is known internationally for articulating the master suppression techniques, and her research interests also include feminist economics and women's culture. She holds honorary doctorates at the University of Copenhagen, Saint Mary's University (Halifax), and Uppsala University, and received the Rachel Carson Prize and the Order of St. Olav in 1997.

Academic career

Ås' parents were teachers. Her mother and maternal grandmother were both politically active, and her father was an avid reader and inventor. She completed her university degree in 1953 and worked on issues related to smoking hazards, consumer protection, children's safety, and housing. She taught and conducted research on women's issues at the University of Oslo, where she was an Assistant Professor of Psychology 1969–1980, Associate Professor 1980–1991 and full Professor of Social Psychology from 1991 until she retired in 1994. In 1983, she, Suzanne Stiver Lie, and Maj Birgit Rørslett, were commissioned to create an experimental project and establish Norway's first Women's University. She has been a visiting professor at the University of Missouri (1967–68), Mount Saint Vincent University (1983), Uppsala University (1989), Saint Mary's University (Halifax) (1997), and St. Scholastica's College (1999).

Political career

Ås was for several years a member of the Norwegian Labour Party. Her first political office was the municipal council in Asker in 1967. Four years later, she led with Karla Skaare what was later known as the non-partisan "women's coup" in 1971, when women achieved majority representation in three of Norway's largest municipal assemblies. In Asker, this initiative was spearheaded by Berit Ås, Tove Billington Bye, Marie Borge Refsum and Kari Bjerke Andreassen. She was a deputy member of parliament for the Labour Party 1969–1973.

She was effectively expelled from the Labour Party during the 1972 EU debate, after which she became the first leader of the Socialist Left Party. She served in the Norwegian parliament from 1973 to 1977, and led several political campaigns, including Women's International Strike for Peace in 1962, the women's movement against membership in the European Union, and others. She was among the first to call for a formal risk assessment of offshore drilling operations in the North Sea.

She also made important contributions to the feminist cause in Norway. She led efforts to establish the Feminist University in Norway in the 1980s, and formulated five Master suppression techniques she claims are used against women in particular, though these may be used against other disadvantaged groups as well. She co-founded the Nordic Women's University in 2011.

In 1973, she stayed with John Lennon and Yoko Ono in their Manhattan apartment for a week, while participating at the Women's Conference. Lennon had become interested in meeting her after having read one of her speeches; rumor has it that she didn't know who Lennon was.

Other
She contributed the piece "More power to women!" to the 1984 anthology Sisterhood Is Global: The International Women's Movement Anthology, edited by Robin Morgan.

Honours
Honorary doctorate, University of Copenhagen
Honorary doctorate, Saint Mary's University (Halifax)
Honorary doctorate, Uppsala University
Knight First Class, Order of St. Olav, 1997
Rachel Carson Prize, 1997

The Rachel Carson Prize was established spontaneously on her initiative in 1991.

References

External links
 Compendium of speeches celebrating birthday of Berit Ås (2003)
  Aftenposten.no: Berit Ås 

Norwegian women's rights activists
1928 births
Living people
Norwegian psychologists
Norwegian women psychologists
Norwegian women academics
Academic staff of the University of Oslo
Labour Party (Norway) politicians
Socialist Left Party (Norway) politicians
Members of the Storting
Women members of the Storting
Norwegian feminists
Norwegian socialist feminists
Asker politicians
Politicians from Oslo
People from Fredrikstad
20th-century Norwegian politicians
20th-century Norwegian women politicians